The Keyhole Castle is located in the East Hill neighborhood of Prince Albert, Saskatchewan, Canada. It was built as the residence for Samuel McLeod, a former businessman, mayor of Prince Albert and federal politician. Architect Erich Wohann of Minneapolis designed the building, with construction ending in 1913.  In 1975, the Keyhole Castle was designated a National Historic Site of Canada. The building contains a ballroom on the top floor.

Samuel McLeod was a successful businessman, and mayor of Prince Albert mayor both in 1886 and in 1919.
The institute for stained glass in Canada has documented the stained glass at Keyhole Castle.

Keyhole Castle is currently a Bed & Breakfast. The Castle is also available as an event location, using either the ballroom, dining room, or, in the summer, the yard.

References

External links
Historic Site Designation

Buildings and structures in Prince Albert, Saskatchewan
Houses completed in 1913
National Historic Sites in Saskatchewan
Queen Anne architecture in Canada
Houses in Canada
1913 establishments in Saskatchewan